Clifford Harvey Schmautz (March 17, 1939 – February 11, 2002) was a Canadian professional ice hockey right wing. The majority of his career, which lasted from 1959 to 1975, was spent in the Western Hockey League with the Portland Buckaroos, where he played together with his brother Arnie Schmautz and scored forty goals three times and led the league in scoring in the 1965–1965–66 season.  He also played 56 games in the National Hockey League with the Buffalo Sabres and Philadelphia Flyers during the 1970–71 season. In his short NHL career, Schmautz scored thirteen goals and added nineteen assists. His younger brother Bobby Schmautz also played in the NHL.

Career statistics

Regular season and playoffs

References

External links
 

1939 births
2002 deaths
Buffalo Bisons (AHL) players
Buffalo Sabres players
Canadian ice hockey right wingers
Ice hockey people from Saskatchewan
Moose Jaw Canucks players
Omaha Knights (IHL) players
Philadelphia Flyers players
Portland Buckaroos players
Sault Thunderbirds players
Sportspeople from Saskatoon